This article describes the composition and actions of the Argentine air forces in the Falklands War, which comprised units of the Air Force, Army, Navy and other services.
 
For a description of air forces of the United Kingdom, see British air services in the Falklands War.

Background
Despite initiating the war, Argentina had not prepared a plan for the subsequent defence of the islands. The military dictatorship that governed the country at the time regarded the seizure of the Falklands as a political act to obtain a diplomatic bargaining position, and not as an act of war. Consequently they were taken by surprise when the British responded with a large-scale mobilization, and a task force to retake the islands.

The Argentine Air Force (Fuerza Aérea Argentina; FAA), which had never fought against an external enemy since its establishment in 1912, had never considered the possibility of waging a long-range naval air campaign against a major NATO power. It was not trained or equipped for such a mission. The FAA had only two tanker aircraft to serve the whole air force and navy, and its fighter-bomber Mirage IIIs and IAI Daggers were not equipped for aerial refuelling. The FAA's training, tactics and equipment were focused on a possible war against Chile, resulting from disputes such as the Beagle conflict.

The option to attack Chile was a cause of great concern to the Argentina military during the war. The Chilean armed forces had deployed a significant force to Chile's common border with Argentina, and the FAA was forced to reinstate their retired F-86 Sabres to bolster Argentina's air defences. In Argentina's favour, Peru immediately offered its support to the Argentine cause, with the Peruvian Air Force even offering to fly combat missions. This was politely declined by the Argentine government. As the war progressed, Peru and Venezuela sent critical aircraft spare parts to Argentina, urgently needed by the FAA and the Brazilian Air Force leased two EMB111 Bandeirantes maritime patrol aircraft to the Argentine Navy. Finally on June 4, ten Peruvian Mirage 5 with AS-30 missiles arrived to Tandil but the war ended before they could be used. Israel Aircraft Industries technicians that were in the country under the 1979 IAI Daggers contract continued their work during the conflict.

By the best estimates, Argentina had about 240 planes when the war broke out. About half of those were posted in the interior and along the Chilean border. The long distances from their bases prevented them from using their top speed or they risked running out of fuel. Although the Argentines had more aeroplanes than the British Task force, a good number of them were Pucara turboprops. Also, the A-4 Skyhawk force were dependent on the two available KC-130 tankers, limiting the number of aeroplanes which could attack simultaneously.

Argentina's fleet of A-4 Skyhawk attack jets was in very poor condition. The arms embargo placed by the United States in 1976, due to the "Dirty War", had made most airframes unusable. The involvement of Israel in helping to return the A-4 to full operational status has been alleged, but has never been confirmed.

The small air arm of the Argentine Navy (Armada Republica Argentina; ARA) was in the middle of the transition from the A-4Q Skyhawk to the new Super Etendard. Only five of the Etendard's anti-ship Exocet missiles had been delivered at the time of the conflict, at which point an arms embargo prevented the delivery of further shipments. Additionally, the required programming for the missiles to interact with the Etendard's computers had not been completed by French engineers when the conflict broke out. France, being an ally of the United Kingdom, recalled all technicians, which left Argentine scientists and electronic engineers to figure out a way to make the missiles take input from the plane's computers. Navy pilots, particularly those of the 3rd Naval Fighters Squadron flying A-4Qs, were the only personnel trained in bombing warships. Air Force pilots trained during April against the two Argentine Type 42 destroyers, similar to those of the British Fleet, and according to the Naval officers all the sorties were shot down, causing great concern to the High Command until the successful May 1 strikes which proved that aircraft could survive.

Finally, Argentine military aviation had never been involved in an international conflict, indeed the last time the Argentine military had been involved in an international conflict was the War of the Triple Alliance more than a century before.

In spite of these disadvantages, Argentine air units bore the brunt of the battle during the six-week war, and inflicted serious damage and losses to the naval forces of the United Kingdom. Low-flying jets attacking British ships provided some of the most sobering and dramatic images of the war. By the end of the conflict, the British forces had come to admire the FAA's spirited conduct in the face of an effective air defence network.  Admiral Sandy Woodward, the British Task Force commander said: "[t]he Argentine Air Force fought extremely well and we felt a great admiration for what they did."

The British Operational Research Branch Report declassified and released to the public in February 2013 states:

Organisation
The air units involved in the Falklands War were under the following chain of command:
  Military junta – Brigadier General (Lieutenant General) Basilio Lami Dozo
 Air Defence Command – Brigadier Jorge Hughes was in charge of the radar network, Mirage IIIEA interceptors and anti-aircraft defences on the mainland.
 Strategic Air Command - Brigadier Helmuth Weber. Coordinated air assets through all the country. The CAE also had the main role of long range maritime surveillance with Boeing 707s and C-130 Hercules.
 Southern Air Force – Brigadier Ernesto Crespo.  The FAS was the main organisation involved in combat over the conflict zone.
 South Atlantic Military Theatre - Vice Admiral Juan Lombardo. Basically a naval command with the role of coordinating the air, surface and submarine assets in the South Atlantic area. Initially, during the invasion of the islands on 2 April and before hostilities broke out, the islands were supposedly to be under their command and was considered as the only organisation needed to manage the crisis.
 Falklands Military Garrison - Brigade General Mario Menéndez (Army)
 Air Component - Brigadier Luis Castellano

Deployment

Air units moved from home bases to southern facilities. Amid fears about British/Chilean air strikes and/or SAS raids, Argentine aircraft were dispersed in the surrounding areas of their southern airfields, e.g., several parts of the national route #3 were used for this purpose.

 Ezeiza International Airport, Buenos Aires
Boeing 707
 NAS Almirante Zar, Trelew, Chubut Province
B.Mk62 Canberra
 AFB Comodoro Rivadavia, IX Air Brigade, Chubut Province ( FAS command site )  map 
KC/C-130 Hercules
Fokker F28
Escuadron Fenix
Mirage IIIEA
FMA IA 58 Pucará
CIC Comodoro, air traffic control center
 Airfield Puerto San Julián, Santa Cruz Province
IAI Dagger - La Marinete Squadron
A-4C Skyhawk
Cardion AN/TPS-44 radar w/ GADA 601 Army
 Airfield Puerto Santa Cruz, Santa Cruz Province
A-4P Skyhawk
 AFB Rio Gallegos, Santa Cruz Province
Mirage IIIEA
A-4P Skyhawk
FMA IA 58 Pucará
Navy Exploration Squadron after 13 May: S-2E Trackers and 2 leased Brazilian Air Force EMB111 Bandeirantes (2-P-201 & 2-P-202)
CIC Gallegos, air traffic control center
 NAS Almirante Quijada, Río Grande, Tierra del Fuego
IAI Dagger - Las Avutardas Salvajes Squadron
A-4Q Skyhawk
Super Étendard
SP-2H Neptune
 AFB Puerto Argentino, Port Stanley Airport, Falkland Islands
FMA IA 58 Pucará Air Force
Aermacchi MB.339A Navy
T-34 Mentor Navy
Helicopters from all services
CIC Malvinas, AN/TPS-43 radar and anti-aircraft defences from all services
 AFB Condor, Goose Green grass airfield, Falkland Islands
FMA IA 58 Pucará Air Force
Anti-aircraft cannons Air Force
 NAS Calderon, Pebble Island grass airfield, Falkland Islands
FMA IA 58 Pucará Air Force
T-34 Mentor Navy
Short Skyvan Coast Guard
 Aircraft carrier ARA Veinticinco de Mayo, April 2 to May 3
McDonnell Douglas A-4Q Skyhawk
Grumman S-2E Tracker
Sikorsky S-61D-4

Units
The numbers in bold are the number of aircraft engaged in combat without counting those in reserve, the numbers in brackets are the number of aircraft lost during the war.

Argentine Air Force

 1st Air Brigade -
Lockheed C-130H Hercules, 7 (1)
Lockheed KC-130H Hercules Tanker 2
Boeing 707-320C、 3
Fokker F-28-1000C 、6
 Fokker F-27-400M、 12
 2nd Air Brigade - English Electric B.62 Canberra、 8 (2)
 Grupo Aérofotográfico - Learjet 35A 2 (1)
 3rd Air Brigade -
 Falkland Islands - FMA IA 58A Pucará 24 (13)
 Comodoro Rivadavia - FMA IA 58A Pucará 1 (1)
 4th Air Brigade - McDonnell Douglas A-4C Skyhawk 16 (9)
 5th Air Brigade - McDonnell Douglas A-4B Skyhawk 30 (10)
 6th Air Brigade - Israel Aircraft Industries Dagger 27 (11)
 7th Air Brigade -
Lockheed C-130E Hercules, 3
Boeing CH-47C Chinook 2
Bell 212 2
8th Air Brigade  
Dassault Mirage IIIEA 16 (2)
DHC-6-200　1

Argentine Navy

 (Argentine Naval Aviation)

 1st Naval Air Attack Squadron - Aermacchi MB.339A 6 (2)
 2nd Naval Air Fighter/Attack Squadron - Dassault Super Étendard 4 (sn. 3-A-201 was cannibalized for spare parts)
 3rd Naval Air Fighter/Attack Squadron - McDonnell Douglas A-4Q Skyhawk 8 (3)
 Naval Air Antisubmarine Squadron - Grumman S-2E Tracker 6
 Naval Air Training Squadron - Beechcraft T-34C-1 Toubo Mentor 4 (4)
 Naval Air Exploration Squadron - Lockheed SP-2H Neptune 2 (both retired by end of May due to airframe attrition)
 1st Naval Air Helicopter Squadron -
Aérospatiale Alouette AI03 SA361B 10 (1)
Lynx Mk.23 2 (1)
Britten-Norman BN-2A Islander 1
 2nd Naval Air Helicopter Squadron - Sikorsky S-61D-4 5
 Naval Air Transport Squadrons -
Lockheed L-188PF Electra 3
Fokker F-28-3000C 3
P-95 Bandeirulha 2

Argentine Army

 ( Argentine Army Aviation )

 601 Army Aviation Battalion -
Boeing CH-47C Chinook 2 (1)
Agusta A109A 3 (1)
Bell UH-1H Iroquois 9
Aérospatiale Puma SA330L 5 (5).
 South Georgia April 3 - Aérospatiale Puma SA330L 1 (1)

Argentine Coast Guard

 Aviation Service -
Aérospatiale Puma SA330L 1
Short Skyvan 3M-200 5 (2)

Argentine auxiliary aircraft
Escuadrón Fénix — 77 civilian business planes:
Agusta 109C 1
Aero Commander 500B 2
Aero Commander 500S/Shrike Commander 1
Aero Commander 680FL  Grand Commander 1
Aero Commander AC690A 2
Aero Commander AC690B 2
Aero Commander AC690C 1
Bell 205A-1　1
Bell 206 1
Bell 212 1
MBB Bo 105A 4
Cessna500 Citation I 4
Cessna501 Citation I 1
Cessna550 Citation II 1
C-47B-15-DK 2
DC-3 2
Gates Learjet24 1
Gates Learjet24A 2
Gates Learjet24D 1
Gates Learjet25D 3
Gates Learjet35 4
Gates Learjet35A 1
Gates Learjet36A 1
Gates Learjet36C 1
Hawker Siddeley HS.125-700B 1
IA50G2 Guaraní II 1
Mitsubishi MU-2B-26A 4
MD 500C 3
Piper Aerostar600A 11
Piper Aerostar TS600 5
Piper Aerostar TS601A 1
Piper Aerostar TS601B 1
Piper Aerostar TS601P 1
SA226-T Merlin IIIB 1
Sikorsky S-61N 2
Sikorsky S-58T 2

Aerolíneas Argentinas and Austral airlines:
Boeing 737-200　2
BAC 1-11-515FB 1  (airlift to Patagonia and Port Stanley).

Armament

Machine guns and autocannons:
 7.62 mm FM M2-20: Pucaras
 20 mm Colt Mk.12 Cannon: A-4s
 20 mm Hispano-Suiza HS.804 Cannon: Pucaras
 30 mm DEFA cannon: IAI Daggers and Mirage IIIEA
Unguided rockets:
 ZUNI 127 mm: MB.339s
 70 mm: MB339s
 105 mm: Pucaras
Missiles:
 Air-to-Air:
 AIM-9B Sidewinder short-range IR: only Navy A-4Q Skyhawks up to May 1
 Rafael Shafrir 2 short-range IR: IAI Daggers and A-4C on May 1
 Matra R550 Magic short-range IR: received April 15 for Mirage IIIEA
 Matra R530 short-range semi-active radar and IR: Mirage IIIEA
 Air-to-Surface:
 Aérospatiale AM.39 Exocet  Anti-Ship Missile: 5 units on Super Etendards
 AS 30 air-surface missiles.  Supplied by the Peruvian Air Force and arriving at the Tandil AFB (home base of the FAA Dagger) at the end of May, the war ended before they could be used.
Unguided retarded Gravity bomb: Thirteen bombs hit British ships without detonating as they were dropped from very low altitude and there was insufficient time in the air for them to arm themselves. The problem was solved by June with new fuzes (Kappa) bought in Spain .
 US built Mark 82 Snake Eye (500 lb / 227 kg) : A-4Q
 British built "1000 lb" (450 kg) : A-4B/C, IAI Daggers and Canberras
 Spain built Expal BR/BRP 250 kg : A-4B/C and IAI Daggers
 Argentine built PG 125 kg : Pucaras
 Napalm : Pucaras

Air campaign

Battle of San Carlos (1982)
Bluff Cove Air Attacks

Missions
Attack Missions:

Other Missions:
{| class="wikitable"
|-
! style="width:150px;"|System
! style="width:600px;"|Obs
|-
| Mirage IIIEA
| Argentine sources indicate that a number were withdrawn from operations over the islands to protect the mainland against Vulcan strikes,
 however, they made 58 sorties providing decoys for the strike units with particular success on the June 8 attacks against the British landings ships. Their lesser internal fuel capacity, compared to the Daggers, prevented them from being used in their escort role.
|-
| Boeing 707
| The unarmed airliner made 54 cargo flights and other 61 for reconnaissance and surveillance duties against the British Task Force heading southFAA map locating the fleet for the first time on April 21 when a Sea Harrier shepherded the 707 away. On May 22 another 707 managed to evade 4 Sea Dart missiles launched against it but the risk of further sorties was too great and from that point on the 707's made no further attempt to find the Task Force. On another occasion they made a casual encounter with a British Nimrod both unarmed aircraft looked each other over and continued their missions.
|-
| Embraer P-95 Bandeirulha
| Two aircraft were incorporated into the naval aviation on May 21. They flew 39 maritime patrol sorties from Rio Gallegos airbase. They were returned to the Brazilian air force on June 24
|-
| IA 58 Pucará
| They performed reconnaissance and ground attack missions from the Falklands airfields and surveillance of the Patagonian coast from bases in Southern Argentina. Most of the island-based Pucarás were destroyed on the ground, due to the lack of Hardened Aircraft Shelters. They shot down a Royal Marines Westland Scout during the battle of Goose Green.
|-
| Fenix Squadron
| 126 decoying plus 52 reconnaissance sorties. They were also extensively used as communications relay and pathfinder flights to guide the combat jets with the Learjets' superior navigation systems.
|-
| C-130 Hercules
| 33 night flights to BAM Puerto Argentino in May/June (Blockade runner). Among the cargo transported in those flight were the 602 Army Commandos Coy, 155 mm CITEFA cannons, an improvised land based Exocet launcher, the Roland SAM system and a RASIT radar replacement. They evacuated 263 wounded and a British PoW in their returning flights. Starting 15 May, they also took over the dangerous task of searching for naval targets for the strike units, after the retirement of the last SP-2H Neptune available. On one of these daylight missions, a Hercules was intercepted and shot down by a Sea Harrier.29 May, the British tanker British Wye was hit by bombs dropped by a Hercules, north of South Georgia (Not officially recognized by the FAA)
|-
| KC-130 Hercules
| Refueling sorties for A-4s and Super Étendards, also for battle damaged fighters.
|-
| Fokker F-28 Navy
| 15 night flights to BAM Puerto Argentino in May/June (Blockade runner)
|-
| Army Aviation
| 796 helicopter flights on the islands
|-
| 1st Air Brigade Construction Group Air Force
| In charge of maintaining Port Stanley airbase operable. Throughout the conflict, the airport installations were attacked with 237 bombs, 1,200 shells from the Royal Navy gunline and 16 missiles, however, it was never out of action entirely. Many sources claim that the runway was covered with piles of dirt during the day causing British intelligence to surmise that repairs were still in progress. Craters were in fact heaps of earth placed there to make it look as though the runway was damaged.  In fact, the British were well aware that the runway was still in use by C-130 and attempted to interdict these flights leading to the loss of a C-130 on June 1.<ref>Ward, Sharkey,'Sea Harrier Over The Falklands: A Maverick at War, Phoenix; New Ed edition, London, 2007, </ref>
|}

Successes

Casualties and aircraft losses

Human losses

 6 Army aviation
 4 Naval aviation
 55 Argentine Air Force members
 29 pilots
 12 air crew (6 on C-130H shot down June 1,  4 on Learjet LJ-35A shot down June 7, and 2 Canberra navigators)
 14 Ground crew

Aircraft losses

Aircraft lost in the air in combat

Argentine strike aircraft did not carry air-to-air missiles, with the exception of 8th Air Brigade Mirage IIIEA fighters and 6th Air Brigade Daggers on May 1. All retained a secondary armament of either 20 mm or 30 mm cannon.

Total destroyed in the air: 45 (Sea Harrier 21, Sea Dart 7, Sea Wolf 4, Stinger 2, Sea Cat 1, Rapier 1,  Blowpipe 1, Combination/Gunfire 6, Friendly fire 2)

Aircraft lost by other causes

 Destroyed on the ground
 9 FMA IA 58 Pucará
 1 Agusta A109 Army 1 Boeing Ch-47C Chinook Army 2 Aérospatiale Puma SA330L Army 4 Beechcraft T-34 Mentor Navy 2 Skyvan 3-M Coast Guard 2 Bell UH-1H Iroquois Army Captured after the war
 11 FMA IA 58 Pucará
 2 Agusta A109 Army 7 Bell UH-1H Iroquois Army 1 Boeing CH-47C Chinook Army 1 Aérospatiale Puma SA330L Coast Guard 3 Aermacchi MB.339A Navy 2 Bell 212
 Lost with ARA General Belgrano
 1 Aérospatiale Alouette AI03 Navy Flying accident in the war zone
 1 Westland Lynx HAS.Mk.23 Navy — 2 May, hit ARA Santísima Trinidad 2 FMA IA 58 Pucará — 28 May, hit ground, recovered in 1986, 24 May.According to www.naval-history.net/F64argaircraftlost.htm a Pucará was lost over the Atlantic on a reconnaissance mission from Comodoro Rivadavia
 1 Aermacchi MB.339A Navy — 3 May, bad weather crash
 2 McDonnell Douglas A-4C Skyhawk — 9 May, South Jason Island

Total lost by other causes: 55.

Total aircraft losses
75 fixed-wing aircraft and 25 helicopters.

See also

Argentine ground forces in the Falklands War
Argentine naval forces in the Falklands War
British air services in the Falklands War
Pablo Carballo
Raid on Pebble Island
Roberto Curilovic

 Footnotes 

References

 Notes 

 Bibliography 
  FAA Commodore Ruben Oscar Moro  La Guerra Inaudita, 2000 
  Dagger & Finger en Argentina  book link
  Frédéric Marsaly: Super Étendard au Combat: la saga d'un guerrier, Aviation Française Magazine, Jan/Feb 2007, ISSN 1951-9583.

 Online sources 
British site about Argentine Aircraft lost
Britains Small Wars.com

 Further reading 
 Online material 

 Printed material 
 Chant, C.: Air War in the Falklands 1982, 2001, Osprey Publishing, 
 Gunston, B.: Aviation Fact File (Modern Fighting Aircraft) - Harrier, 1984, Salamander Books Ltd., 
 
 
 

 Shields, J.: Air Power in the Falklands Conflict - An Operational Level Insight into Air Warfare in the South Atlantic, 2021, Pen & Sword, Great Britain, 

External links

Foreign Studies
 Argentine Airpower in the Falklands War - Analysis and Conclusions
 Argentina's Tactical Aircraft Employment in the Falklands Islands War  - Air Command and Staff College, Air University, USAF

Official Sites
  Argentine Air Force (FAA) official site about the Malvinas/Falklands Air War
  Argentine Coast Guard (PNA) official site about the Malvinas/Falklands War

 Other sites 
 YouTube video Argentine Air Force on the Falklands War
  "Historia de la Aviación Naval Argentina Tomo III (Conflicto del Atlántico Sur)" Full book content at "Radar Malvinas" website (accessed 2016-07-14'')

Military units and formations of Argentina in the Falklands War
Argentine Air Force
Argentine Naval Aviation
Argentine Army
Falklands War orders of battle
Aerial operations and battles of the Falklands War
 
1982 in the Falkland Islands
20th-century military history of the United Kingdom